Miracles from Heaven is a 2016 American Christian drama film directed by Patricia Riggen and written by Randy Brown. It is based on Miracles from Heaven by Christy Beam, which recounts the true story of her young daughter who had a near-death experience and was later cured of an incurable disease. The film stars Jennifer Garner, Kylie Rogers, Martin Henderson, John Carroll Lynch, Eugenio Derbez, and Queen Latifah. Principal photography began in Atlanta, Georgia, in July 2015. The film was released on March 16, 2016. The movie was financially successful, becoming the 8th highest-grossing Christian film in the United States. Although critical reception was mixed, Garner's performance earned general praise.

Plot 
Set in Burleson, Texas, between 2007 and 2012, the film centers on little girl Anna (Kylie Rogers), daughter of Christy Beam (Jennifer Garner). One day, Anna starts to vomit, and when examined by her doctor, he does not find anything abnormal. On March 20, 2008, Anna wakes up her family at midnight due to intense stomach pain, severe enough so her parents      take her to the hospital. Doctors find no signs of illness, perhaps either acid reflux, or lactose intolerance, but Christy is incredulous.

The following morning, Christy finally finds a pediatrician in the hospital able to diagnose Anna with an abdominal obstruction, and he tells them he must operate immediately or she will die. After emergency surgery, the doctor explains that Anna has been left with intestinal pseudo-obstruction and she is unable to eat, so feeding tubes are needed for her nutrition. The doctor then tells the Beams about America's foremost pediatric gastroenterologist, Dr. Samuel Nurko (Eugenio Derbez) in Boston, but explains it could take months for them to be seen. In January 2009, Christy and Anna travel to Boston despite not having an appointment with him.

Dr. Nurko has a last minute opening, and when Anna is subsequently examined at Boston Children's Hospital, the extent of her chronic illness is found. She then goes through extensive treatment. During this ordeal, Anna and her mother befriend local Massachusetts resident Angela Bradford (Queen Latifah), as well as Ben (Wayne Péré) and his daughter, Haley (Hannah Alligood) who has terminal cancer.

On December 29, 2011, Anna and her bigger sister Abbie (Brighton Sharbino), climb up to a very high branch of an old cotton tree. While on the branch, it begins to break. Anna goes to the trunk for safety, whereupon stepping on it, she falls into the hollowed out center to the base of the tree.

When Christy finds out what happened, she desperately calls her husband Kevin (Martin Henderson), as well as the fire department. Anna is then rescued by the firefighters, who warn Christy to expect the worst, saying that nobody could fall 30 feet without sustaining a serious injury, broken bones or paralysis. Once out, Anna is airlifted to a hospital, where a battery of tests are run, and all of them come back negative. Other than a minor concussion, Anna is uninjured.

Sometime after the fall, Anna seems to no longer be affected by her illness. When Christy and Anna go to an appointment with Dr. Nurko, he tells Christy that she is miraculously cured. Anna then recounts with her parents her experience during the fall. She describes how her soul left her body during the fall, and God promised that she would be cured of her illness upon her return to Earth.

At church, Christy shares the story of how God miraculously healed her daughter with His love. As Christy finishes her speech, one of the congregation protests, stating that he does not believe her. Ben, who has traveled from Boston upon hearing the story about Anna, believes her. He also shares that Haley died peacefully as Anna gave her faith when in the hospital (Anna is saddened by this news because Haley was a dear friend).

In the end, the Beams spend some quality time together and Christy says to always believe in miracles.

Cast 
 Kylie Rogers as Anna Beam
 Jennifer Garner as Christy Beam, Anna's mother
 Martin Henderson as Dr. Kevin Beam, Christy's husband and Anna's father
 Eugenio Derbez as Dr. Nurko, a pediatric gastroenterologist who is Anna's doctor at the Boston Children's Hospital.
 Queen Latifah as Angela, a waitress who befriends Anna and her mother in a restaurant in Boston
 Brighton Sharbino as Abbie Beam, the oldest Beam daughter
 Courtney Fansler as Adelynn Beam, the youngest Beam daughter
 Zach Sale as Dr. Blyth, the first doctor to listen to Christy about her sick daughter
 Kelly Collins Lintz as Emmy, a family friend of the Beams
 John Carroll Lynch as Reverend Scott, the senior pastor of the Beam family's church
 Brandon Spink as Billy Snyder, a friend of Anna
 Hannah Alligood as Haley, a cancer patient who becomes friends with Anna and later dies offscreen
 Wayne Péré as Ben, Haley's father
 Bruce Altman as Dr. Burgi, Anna's doctor who is the head of the pediatric division at the hospital in Texas
 Suehyla El-Attar as a receptionist at the Boston Children's hospital

The real Beam family makes a cameo at the end of the film before the credits.

Production 
On November 10, 2014, The Hollywood Reporter reported that Sony Pictures Entertainment had acquired the film adaptation rights to a faith-based memoir, Miracles From Heaven: A Little Girl, Her Journey to Heaven, and Her Amazing Story of Healing, written by Christy Beam, and hired Randy Brown to write the script. The team behind the studios' 2014 Christian film Heaven Is for Real, T. D. Jakes and Joe Roth, were retained to produce the film along with DeVon Franklin.

On April 8, 2015, the studio hired Patricia Riggen to direct the film. On April 30, 2015, Jennifer Garner was cast to star in the film as Christy Beam. On June 22, 2015, The Hollywood Reporter reported that Queen Latifah was cast as a waitress who befriends Anna and Beam at the Boston Children's Hospital. On the same day, Variety confirmed the casting of Martin Henderson to play the girl's father and Beam's husband.

On June 29, 2015, Kylie Rogers was cast as Beam's sick daughter Anna. On July 17, 2015, Eugenio Derbez was cast to play a character inspired by Children's Hospital specialist Dr. Samuel Nurko, an American-based Mexican pediatric gastroenterologist who eases his young patients' treatment by playing games with them. John Carroll Lynch was also cast in the film as the pastor.

Filming 
Principal photography on the film began in Atlanta, Georgia, in July 2015. David R. Sandefur and Emma E. Hickox were appointed as production designer and editor, respectively. On August 2, 2015, Latifah and Garner were spotted on the set of film in Atlanta.

Soundtrack
The Miracles from Heaven soundtrack features songs from Howie Day, George Harrison, Clayton Anderson, Third Day and others. The southern Christian rock band Third Day made a cameo as the church worship band.

Release
On May 11, 2015, the film was scheduled for a March 18, 2016 release by Columbia Pictures. On January 10, it was moved up two days later to March 16. The film held its world premiere on February 21, 2016, in Dallas, Texas.

Home media
Miracles from Heaven was released on Digital Media on June 21, 2016, and was followed by a DVD, Blu-ray, and 4K Ultra HD release on July 12, 2016, from AFFIRM Films and Sony Pictures Home Entertainment. The film debuted in second place on the home video sales chart behind The Divergent Series: Allegiant for the week ending on July 17, 2016.

Reception

Box office
Miracles from Heaven grossed $61.7 million in North America and $12.2 million in other territories for a worldwide total of $73.9 million, against a budget of $13 million.

The film grossed $1.9 million on its first day, finishing second at the box office behind Zootopia ($4.6 million). The film had an $18 million Wednesday-to-Sunday gross, including $14.8 million in its opening weekend, finishing third at the box office behind Zootopia ($37.2 million) and The Divergent Series: Allegiant ($29 million).

On its opening weekend in the United Kingdom, Miracles from Heaven grossed $29 thousand, dropping to $231 by week four.

Critical response
Miracles from Heaven received generally mixed reviews from critics, with Garner's performance receiving praise. On Rotten Tomatoes, the film has an approval rating of 45%, based on 93 reviews, with an average rating of 5.10/10. The site's consensus reads, "Miracles from Heaven makes the most out of an outstanding performance from Jennifer Garner, but it isn't quite enough to keep this faith-based drama from preaching to the choir." On Metacritic the film has a score of 44 out of 100, based on 20 critics, indicating "mixed or average reviews". Audiences polled by CinemaScore gave the film an average grade of "A+" on an A+ to F scale.

Accolades

References

External links
 
 
 
 Miracles from Heaven at History vs. Hollywood

2016 drama films
2016 films
2010s children's drama films
American drama films
Columbia Pictures films
TriStar Pictures films
Affirm Films films
American children's drama films
Drama films based on actual events
Films about children
Films about Christianity
Films about diseases
Films about evangelicalism
Films based on non-fiction books
Films directed by Patricia Riggen
Films produced by Joe Roth
Films set in 2011
Films set in Texas
Films shot in Atlanta
Heaven and hell films
Fiction about near-death experiences
Films scored by Carlo Siliotto
2010s English-language films
2010s American films